Portage Lakes is a census-designated place (CDP) in Summit County, Ohio, United States. The population was 9,870 at the 2000 census. The city of Green is adjacent to the southeast and Akron on the north. The nearby Portage Lakes of the area include but are not limited to Turkeyfoot Lake, Nimisila Reservoir, Mud Lake, and Long Lake. The lakes are connected by a series of "channels". There is a Portage Lakes State Park with boat launching ramps and seasonal beach swimming.

Portage Lakes is part of the Akron Metropolitan Statistical Area.

Geography
Portage Lakes is located at  (41.0034979, -81.5348850).

At the 2000 census, Portage Lakes included portions of Coventry and Franklin townships.  On 1 January 2005, all of Franklin Township was merged into the village of New Franklin; as a result, the CDP's Franklin Township portion is now entirely within New Franklin. Therefore, the CDP today consists of territory only in Coventry Township, as CDPs are located only in unincorporated areas.

Demographics

As of the census of 2000, there were 9,870 people, 4,195 households, and 2,751 families residing in the CDP. The population density was 1,502.0 people per square mile (580.0/km2). There were 4,491 housing units at an average density of 683.4/sq mi (263.9/km2). The racial makeup of the CDP was 97.79% White, 0.57% African American, 0.31% Native American, 0.31% Asian, 0.01% Pacific Islander, 0.20% from other races, and 0.80% from two or more races. Hispanic or Latino of any race were 0.58% of the population.

There were 4,195 households, out of which 24.8% had children under the age of 18 living with them, 52.3% were married couples living together, 9.3% had a female householder with no husband present, and 34.4% were non-families. 28.2% of all households were made up of individuals, and 9.7% had someone living alone who was 65 years of age or older. The average household size was 2.32 and the average family size was 2.84.

In the CDP the population was spread out, with 20.5% under the age of 18, 6.9% from 18 to 24, 29.4% from 25 to 44, 28.1% from 45 to 64, and 15.1% who were 65 years of age or older. The median age was 41 years. For every 100 females there were 98.7 males. For every 100 females age 18 and over, there were 97.6 males.

The median income for a household in the CDP was $43,698, and the median income for a family was $52,384. Males had a median income of $37,250 versus $26,279 for females. The per capita income for the CDP was $22,267. About 1.9% of families and 5.0% of the population were below the poverty line, including 3.0% of those under age 18 and 8.5% of those age 65 or over.

References

Census-designated places in Summit County, Ohio